Tears for Dolphy is a 1964 album by jazz trumpeter Ted Curson.  The album's title track, an elegy for Eric Dolphy (who died at the end of June that year), has been used in many films.

Reception 

Brian Morton and Richard Cook, writing for The Penguin Guide to Jazz, give Tears for Dolphy a favorable review, noting "a raw sorrow in the title tune," a robust rhythm section, and the leader's "high, slightly old-fashioned sound." Earlier editions of The Penguin Guide to Jazz give the album a rating of three-and-a-half stars.

Chuck Berg, writing for Down Beat, said Curson and saxophonist Bill Barron's "tough, but highly melodic lines above the steady and crisp rhythmic substructure ably provided by bassist Herb Bushler and drummer Dick Berk."

Scott Yanow of AllMusic asserts that most tracks "manage to be both explorative and surprisingly accessible."

Track listing 
All tracks recorded on August 1, 1964.
 "Kassim" (Ted Curson) – 7:41
 "East 6th Street" (Bill Barron) – 5:38
 "7/4 Funny Time" (Barron) – 5:28
 "Tears for Dolphy" (Curson) – 8:32
 "Quicksand" (Curson) – 6:39
 "Reava's Waltz" (Curson) – 7:10
The Black Lion CD (1993) appends three tracks from the same recording session, but that originally appeared on the album Flip Top:
7. "Searching for the Blues" (Curson) – 7:47
8. "Desolation" (Barron) – 8:45
9. "Light Blue" (Barron) - 3:43

Personnel 
 Ted Curson – trumpet, pocket trumpet
 Bill Barron – tenor saxophone, clarinet
 Herb Bushler – double bass
 Dick Berk – drums
 Unidentified – percussion
 Alan Bates – producer, liner notes

References 

Ted Curson albums
1964 albums
Black Lion Records albums
Fontana Records albums